Yablonsky is a rural locality (a khutor) in Novogrigoryevskoye Rural Settlement, Ilovlinsky District, Volgograd Oblast, Russia. The population was 63 as of 2010.

Geography 
Yablonsky is located in steppe, on south of Volga Upland, 50 km west of Ilovlya (the district's administrative centre) by road. Starogrigoryevskaya is the nearest rural locality.

References 

Rural localities in Ilovlinsky District